Cecilia Piñeiro is a Mexican television actress and model.
She has been featured in television programs including Un nuevo amor (2003), La Heredera (2004), Amor en custodia (2005), and Mujer comprada (2009).

Television

 Un nuevo amor (2003) ..... Deborah Luján
 Mirada de mujer, el regreso (2003) .....
 La Heredera (2004) ..... Lucía
 Amor en custodia (2006) ..... Priscila
 Amores Cruzados (2006) ..... Laura
 Se busca un hombre (2007) ..... Leticia
 Mujer comprada (2009) ..... Jenny Laborde
 Entre el amor y el deseo (2010/11) ..... Lucía de la Garza de Lins / Lucía de la Garza de Toledo
 A cada quien su santo (2010)
 Drenaje profundo (2011) ..... Celia
 La Mujer de Judas (2012) ..... Narda Briseño
 La otra cara del alma (2012) ..... Sofía Durán
 Hombre tenías que ser (2013) ..... Minerva Campos
 Las Bravo (2014) ..... Virginia "Vicky" Ibáñez de Villaseñor
 Dos lagos (2017) - Marta de la Garza

Awards and nominations

San Judas de Oro 
San Judas de Oro are awards that were given to the telenovela La Mujer de Judas 2012.

References

External links
 
 

Living people
21st-century Mexican actresses
Mexican female models
Year of birth missing (living people)